This is the discography of the English singer-songwriter Ed Harcourt. To date, Harcourt has released six studio albums, two compilation albums, three EPs, and fourteen singles (eleven of which have been released commercially). Harcourt's debut album Here Be Monsters was released in June 2001, and peaked on the UK Albums Chart at No. 84. His second album From Every Sphere, released in February 2003, became his highest charting album at No. 39, and also features his highest charting single "All of Your Days Will Be Blessed". Released only one year later was his third album Strangers, which features the single "This One's for You", Harcourt's second-highest charting single at No. 41. Two further singles followed throughout the end of 2004 and 2005: "Born in the '70s" and "Loneliness". A download-only compilation entitled Elephant's Graveyard, collecting B-sides and rarities from 2000 to 2005, was issued in summer 2005. Harcourt's fourth studio album The Beautiful Lie was released in June 2006.

A compilation gathering some of Ed Harcourt's best work appeared in October 2007 as Until Tomorrow Then: The Best of Ed Harcourt, featuring the new single "You Put a Spell on Me". Additionally, a special limited edition version of the best-of included a bonus disc of completely unreleased material. Harcourt's contract with Heavenly Records/EMI ended following the compilation's release; consequently, his Russian Roulette EP was released by American label Dovecote Records in May 2009. Following a "self-imposed sabbatical," Harcourt recorded his fifth studio album Lustre, released in June 2010. The album is also the first release on Harcourt's own record label, Piano Wolf Recordings.

Studio albums

Compilations

Extended plays

Singles

Music videos

Compilation/soundtrack contributions
 Rogue's Gallery: Pirate Ballads, Sea Songs, and Chanteys (21 August 2006) – "Farewell Nancy"
 S. Darko (12 May 2009) – "Battleground"
 Son of Rogues Gallery: Pirate Ballads, Sea Songs & Chanteys (2013) – "The Ol' OG"

Composer
 Like Sunday, Like Rain (2014)

Side projects
 Arkhangelsk with Erik Truffaz (14 May 2007)
 Tenebrous Liar (Jul 2007)
 Vocals on the track "And Your Love" from the album 10 Pieces, 10 Bruises by Jonna Lee. (Oct 2007)
 Vocals on the track "Villain" from the album 8:58, a project by Paul Hartnoll.

External links
 Ed Harcourt's official website
 Ed Harcourt's official MySpace page
 EdHarcourt.org – fansite

References

Rock music discographies
Folk music discographies
Discographies of British artists